There are ten residential colleges affiliated with ANU—Bruce Hall, Ursula Hall, Burgmann College, John XXIII College, Toad Hall, Burton & Garran Hall, Graduate House, Fenner Hall, Wamburun Hall and Wright Hall.

Bruce Hall

Burgmann College

Burgmann College, established in 1971, it is the only Australian college to combine undergraduate accommodation with a substantial postgraduate student body. It houses 351 students, roughly one-third of whom are postgraduates. Burgmann College is located inside the western corner of the campus, close to the waters of Lake Burley Griffin. The college is named after Ernest H. Burgmann (1885-1967), the progressive Anglican Bishop (of Goulburn from 1934, and Canberra and Goulburn from 1950 to 1960). Former Australian Prime Minister Kevin Rudd met his wife Thérèse Rein while both living at the college.

Burgmann College and neighbouring John XXIII College are the only remaining independent residential colleges among the Australian National University's ten halls of residence. Burgmann and John XXIII continue to administer their own admissions processes separate from the university's central clearinghouse for accommodation.

Burton & Garran Hall
Burton and Garran Hall is a self catered residential college. It houses approximately 515 students and consists of five blocks.
Burton and Garran Hall was originally established as two separate Halls in 1965, and each Hall had separate administration. Both Halls combined in 1983 to form a single residential college. Garran Hall was named after Sir Robert Garran, the first Solicitor-General of Australia. Burton Hall was named after Herbert Burton, who was appointed Principal and Professor of Economic History at Canberra University College in 1949.

Fenner Hall
Fenner Hall was established in 1992 and houses 451 students. It is a self-catered college and provides communal kitchens and restrooms. The residents are a variety of undergraduate, postgraduate and international students. The college is named after Frank John Fenner (1914-2010) who specialised in the field of virology at the ANU and is a renowned Australian scientist. The original Fenner Hall building was located on Northbourne Avenue, however, was relocated to the newly developed Kambri Precinct at the heart of ANU in 2019. The former Fenner Hall has not been demolished and was rebranded as Gowrie Hall in 2019 as a postgraduate accommodation complex. In 2021, the former building has been repurposed as the Canberra Accommodation Centre. The contemporary design of the new building infused with the commercial life of the university offers a unique living experience.

Fenner Hall is made up of a north wing and south wing. The construction of Fenner Hall featured a number of innovations in design and construction, most notably the use of mass timber structure - an Australian first for this type of building. The building has been measured to have used 33 per cent of the embodied carbon of traditional trades. Other environmental design strategies included the exclusion of fired ceramics in the wet areas, operable windows, fans and electric heaters being served by the Australian Capital Territory’s 100-per-cent renewable energy for climate control, and minimisation of floor finishes throughout.

Fenner Hall is an active member in the Interhall Sports Organisation, fielding teams in all sporting competitions, as well as the Interhall Arts Committee. The governing body of the hall is the Fenner Resident's Committee. The committee is responsible for general advocacy and welfare of the residents, as well as co-curricular life in sports, social and arts.

Graduate House
Graduate House was first established in 1971 and has around 150 graduate student residents.

John XXIII College

John XXIII College is an independent hall of residence for 320 undergraduate students, named after Pope John XXIII and was established in 1967.

Toad Hall

Ursula Hall
Ursula Hall is a catered residential hall. The hall was founded as an all-female institution in 1968 by the Ursuline Order. In 1971 it became a co-educational college. In 2004, Ursula College became known as Ursula Hall. Notable alumni of the Ursula Hall include Barry O'Farrell who was president of the residents committee.

Wright Hall
Wright Hall is a flexi catered residential hall. It was established in 2018 and houses approximately 400 students.

Wamburun Hall 
Wamburun Hall is a self-catered residential hall. It was established in 2019 and houses approximately 500 students. It occupies a building previously used by the residents of Bruce Hall, facing Black Mountain on one side and the southern part of the ANU campus on the other. The name comes from the Ngunnawal word for large black cockatoo and was given to the Hall in 2018.

References

 
Australian National University